The Mohawk Valley Comets were a semi-professional ice hockey team in the North Eastern Hockey League (NEHL) based in Whitestown, New York.

The franchise was a strong team of mostly local talent coming from the Mohawk Valley.  The Comets had a 16-4 record and were in first place during the regular season.  When concerns of Comets players not being available for the final month of the season or playoffs due to their summer jobs starting, Coach Brett Boake requested a schedule change and the season was shortened by a month. The Comets decided 2 days before the playoff weekend that they were not going to participate as not enough players were available and they had financial concerns.

The team did not return for the 2005-06 season.

In 2007-08 Wayne Premo offered to purchase the rights to the Mohawk Valley that were held by the IceCats when league president Jim Cashman wanted to move the IceCats closer to his hometown of Fort Erie, Ontario. Premo located the team in Rome, New York and started the Copper City Chiefs who went 4-4 in their 8 games before the league suspended operations.

Regular season records

North Eastern Hockey League teams
Ice hockey teams in New York (state)
Ice hockey clubs established in 2003
2003 establishments in New York (state)
Sports clubs disestablished in 2004
2004 disestablishments in New York (state)
Oneida County, New York